Frank King (6 April 1911 – 1 November 1996) was an English cricketer.  King was a right-handed batsman who bowled right-arm fast-medium.  He was born at Lewisham, London and educated at Dulwich College.

King made his first-class debut for Cambridge University against Northamptonshire in 1934.  He made nine further first-class appearances for the university, the last of which came against the Free Foresters in 1935.  In his ten first-class appearances, he scored 68 runs at an average of 6.80, with a high score of 16 not out.  With the ball, he took 22 wickets at a bowling average of 27.95, with best figures of 6/64.  These figures, which were one of two five wicket hauls he took, came against Worcestershire in 1934.

In 1937, King made his debut for Dorset in the Minor Counties Championship against Wiltshire.  He played for Dorset after World War II, making a total of 49 Minor Counties Championship appearances from 1937 to 1954.

He died at Sherborne, Dorset on 1 November 1996.

References

External links
Frank King at ESPNcricinfo
Frank King at CricketArchive

1911 births
1996 deaths
People from Lewisham
Cricketers from Greater London
People educated at Dulwich College
Alumni of the University of Cambridge
English cricketers
Cambridge University cricketers
Dorset cricketers